Andrea Huber (born 9 May 1975) is a Swiss cross-country skier who competed from 1993 to 2004. She won a bronze medal in the 4 × 5 km relay at the 2002 Winter Olympics in Salt Lake City and finished 27th in the individual sprint at those same games.

Huber's best finish at the FIS Nordic World Ski Championships was a 17th in the 5 km events both in 1997 and 1999. She won fourteen races at various levels in her career from 1994 to 2004.

Cross-country skiing results
All results are sourced from the International Ski Federation (FIS).

Olympic Games
 1 medal – (1 bronze)

World Championships

a.  Cancelled due to extremely cold weather.

World Cup

Season standings

References

External links
 
 
 

1975 births
Living people
Swiss female cross-country skiers
Cross-country skiers at the 1998 Winter Olympics
Cross-country skiers at the 2002 Winter Olympics
Olympic medalists in cross-country skiing
Medalists at the 2002 Winter Olympics
Olympic bronze medalists for Switzerland
Olympic cross-country skiers of Switzerland
20th-century Swiss women